Nicola Mayr (born 6 April 1978) is an Italian speed skater. She competed in two events at the 2002 Winter Olympics.

References

External links
 

1978 births
Living people
Italian female speed skaters
Olympic speed skaters of Italy
Speed skaters at the 2002 Winter Olympics
Sportspeople from Bolzano